John P. "Jack" Horrigan (December 30, 1925 – June 2, 1973) was a sportswriter for the Buffalo Evening News and American Football League (AFL) public relations director who went on to serve in public relations for the Buffalo Bills.

Jack Horrigan Award
Since 1974, the Pro Football Writers Association have given an annual award in Horrigan's name, to honor a league or club official "for his or her qualities and professional style in helping the pro football writers do their job." Past winners have included Tom Landry and Dan Rooney.

See also
 American Football League players, coaches and contributors

References

Further reading

External links
 Obituary – via newspapers.com

1925 births
1973 deaths
20th-century American non-fiction writers
American male journalists
20th-century American journalists
Buffalo Bills executives
Sportswriters from New York (state)
20th-century American male writers